Pakistan competed at the 2018 Asian Games in Jakarta and Palembang, Indonesia, from 18 August to 2 September 2018. According to the secretary general of Pakistan Olympic Association, around 397 Pakistani athletes  participated in the Games.

This was the worst ever performance in the tournament, lowest total medal count (same as the Asian Games in 2006) and the first time that Pakistan failed to win a gold or silver medal.Pakistan returned home with just 4 bronze medals, finishing lower on the medal table than NOCs like Macau whose population is 0.2 percent of that of Pakistan.  In medal tally, Pakistan finished 34th (out of 37 nations who won medals). Pakistan finished far below its neighbors China (289 medals), India (69 medals) and Iran (62 medals), Pakistan finished 3rd among South Asian countries after India and Nepal (1 silver).

Medallist

The following Pakistan competitors won medals at the Games.

|  style="text-align:left; width:78%; vertical-align:top;"|

Competitors 
Pakistan originally planned to send 397 athletes and officials in 36 sports to the Games. However, due to financial constraints, the contingent was reduced, with 256 athletes and 96 officials in 35 sports sent. The following list shows the number of competitors per sport:

Demonstration events

Archery 

Pakistan Archery Federation (PAF) have prepared 10 athletes to compete at the Games. On 12 July 2018, PAF was named six athletes with 3 men's and 3 women's, but on Friday, 27 July 2018, PAF announced 2 athletes (1 men and 1 women) to compete at the Games after the cut on players made by Pakistan Sports Board.

Recurve

Athletics 

Pakistan entered twelve athletes (10 men's and 2 women's) to participate in the athletics competition at the Games.

Men

Field events

Badminton 

Pakistan Badminton Federation announced its squad of eight athletes (4 men's and 4 women's).

Men

Women

Mixed

Baseball 

Pakistan men's team were drawn in group B at the Games.

Roster
The following is the Pakistan roster for the men's baseball tournament of the 2018 Asian Games.

Round 2 – Group A

Consolation round

Boxing 

Pakistan have prepared 23 boxers with 18 men's and 5 women's in the training camp for the Asian Games. The participating squad for the Games announced in 10 August.

Men

Women

Bridge 

Pakistan Bridge Federation (PBF) was named eleven athletes (9 men's and 2 women's) to compete at the Games.

Men

Mixed

Esports (demonstration) 

Pakistan qualified via South Asia qualifier to compete in the League of Legends tournament at the eSports demonstration event with six men's player under coach Hassan Abdullah (Flux).

Fencing 

Pakistan entered four fencers at the Games. 
Individual

Team

Field hockey 

Pakistan Hockey Federation (PHF) entered the men's field hockey team that competed in pool B with 18 member squad.

Summary

Men's tournament 

Roster

Pool B

Semifinal

Bronze medal game

Football 

Pakistan competed in the group D at the men's football event.

Summary

Men's tournament 

Roster

Group D

Golf 

Men

Gymnastics 

Pakistan was named one gymnast to compete in the artistic event.

Artistic

Handball 

Pakistan men's team competed at the Games in the group B.

Summary

Men's tournament

Roster

Muhammad Nawaz
Hazrat Hussain
Naseen Ullah
Asim Saeed
Muhammad Shahid Pervaiz
Muhammad Zubair
Muhammad Uzair Atif
Nasir Hussain
Tahir Ali
Asif Hayat
Muzamal Hussain
Muhammad Shahid Bashir

Group B

Classification round

Ju-jitsu 

Pakistan prepared their team to compete at the Games.

Men

Judo 

Pakistan Judo Federation announced 7 athletes (4 men's and 3 women's) that will participate in the Games on 19 July 2018. On the directive of Pakistan Sports Board (PSB) this was reduced to a contingent of only 2 men.

Men

Kabaddi

Pakistan sent a squad to compete at the Games.

Summary

Men's tournament

Team roster

Nasir Ali
Waseem Sajjad
Muhammad Nadeem
Muhammad Rizwan
Abid Hussain
Waqar Ali
Tahseen Ullah
Usman Zada
Mudassar Ali
Kashif Razzaq
Muhammad Imran
Hassan Raza

Semifinal

Karate 

Pakistan named six athletes (3 men's and 3 women's) to compete in the kumite event at the Games.

Men

Women

Kurash 

Pakistan was named four men's athlete to compete at the Games.

Men

Paragliding 

Men

Pencak silat 

Seni

Tanding

Rowing 

Men

Women

Rugby sevens 

Pakistan drawn in group A in the men's team event.

Men's tournament 

Squad
The following is the Pakistan squad in the men's rugby sevens tournament of the 2018 Asian Games.

Head coach: Shakeel Ahmed

Muhammad Afzal
Muhammad Shoaib Akbar
Ahmed Wasim Akram
Musdaq Altaf
Faisal Aslam
Khalid Hussain Bhatti
Daud Gill
Muhammad Haroon
Kashif Khwaja
Nasir Mehmood
Ali Shahid
Muhammad Waqas

Group A

Classification round (9–12)

Sailing 

Men

Mixed

Sepak takraw 

Pakistan was named six men's athletes to compete at the Games. The team were drawn in group B for the men's quadran event, and in group A for the men's regu event. This event is the first participation for the Pakistan sepak takraw team at the Asian Games.

Men

Shooting 

Men

Women

Mixed team

Soft tennis

Sport climbing 

Speed

Squash 

The Pakistan Squash Federation (PSF) announced eight athletes (4 men's and 4 women's) that participate at the Games.

Singles

Team

Swimming

Men

Women

Mixed

Table tennis 

Individual

Taekwondo 

Pakistan Taekwondo Federation (PWF) will enter seven athletes (4 men's and 3 women's) into the taekwondo competition.

Tennis 

Men

Women

Mixed

Volleyball 

Pakistan men's team were drawn in pool B.

Indoor volleyball

Men's tournament

 Team roster
The following is the Pakistan roster in the men's volleyball tournament of the 2018 Asian Games.

Head coach: Hamid Movahedi

Pool B

Playoff

7th–12th quarterfinal

7th–10th semifinal

7th place game

Weightlifting 

Pakistan  will compete with four men's weightlifters at the Games.

Men

Wrestling 

Pakistan Wrestling Federation (PWF) have prepared five wrestler to compete at the Games. Two times Commonwealth gold medallist Muhammad Inam opted to skip his participation due to knee injury. PWF finally decide to send four wrestler.

Men's freestyle

Wushu 

Taolu

Sanda

Key: * TV – Technical victory.

Withdrawn Athletes 
The following is a list of athletes originally set to participate in the Games, but due to financial constrains they were not sent.

Archery
The following athletes were withdrawn from the original squad:
 Aqsa Nawaz
 Umm-e-Zahra
 Sumbal Zubair

Basketball 3x3

Judo
The following 5 athletes were part of the original squad:
 Babar Hussain in Men's 66 kg
 Nadeem Akram in Men's 73 kg
 Humaira Ashiq in Women's 48 kg
 Maryam Jabbar in Women's 52 kg
 Amina Toyoda in Women's 57 kg

See also
 Pakistan at the 2018 Asian Para Games

References 

Nations at the 2018 Asian Games
2018
Asian Games